The Legend of Ngong Hills is a 2011 Kenyan animated short film directed by Kwame Nyong'o, based on a Maasai folktale. The film showed at the 2011 Trinidad and Tobago Film Festival, and it won the Best Animation award at the 8th Africa Movie Academy Awards.

Plot
The story is about Ogre, who has a habit of attacking the Maasai Village, but then falls in love with the beautiful young maiden Sanayian.

Cast
Derek Assetto as Ogre
Doreen Kemunto as Sanaiyan
Steve Muturi as Mzee
Joseph Waruinge as Maasai Warrior

References

External links
  
The Legend of Ngong Hills at the Kenya Film Commission

2011 animated films
2011 films
Best Animation Africa Movie Academy Award winners
2010s animated short films
Kenyan animation
Kenyan children's films
Kenyan short films
2010s English-language films